Brachodes compar is a moth of the family Brachodidae. It is found in Croatia, Greece and the Near East.

The wingspan is about 24 mm. The forewings are yellowish brown and the hindwings are white.

References

Moths described in 1879
Brachodidae
Moths of Europe